Cecil Mordecai Hart (November 28, 1883 – July 16, 1940) was a head coach of the Montreal Canadiens.

Biography
Cecil Hart was Jewish, a direct descendant of Aaron Hart who was Canada's first Jewish settler, and was born in Bedford, Quebec.

Hart helped lead the team to three Stanley Cups, in 1924, 1930, and 1931. He was fired after a dispute with Canadiens' owner Léo Dandurand after leading the Canadiens to first place in the 1931–32 season, but after Dandurand and Joseph Cattarinich sold the Canadiens to Ernest Savard and Maurice Forget of the Canadian Arena Company, the Canadiens hit bottom in 1935–36.

To rebuild the team, they rehired Hart in 1936–37, but Hart would only come back if Howie Morenz did. A deal was arranged and with Morenz back, and despite the death of Morenz during the season, Hart managed to lead the Canadiens to first place. After that, the team eroded as age caught up with some key players. When the Canadiens were reclining near the cellar in 1938–39, Cecil resigned as coach and manager. Only eighteen other people have won multiple Stanley Cups besides Hart as a head coach, although he is not currently inducted into the Hockey Hall of Fame despite being eligible. 

Hart later became vice president and treasurer of the Quebec, Ontario and Vermont Baseball League also before his untimely death.

Hart died after a lengthy illness in July 1940. Hart's father, David Hart, donated the Hart Memorial Trophy in 1923. Hart was inducted into the International Jewish Sports Hall of Fame in 1992.

NHL coaching record

References 

1883 births
1940 deaths
Canadian ice hockey coaches
Canadian people of German-Jewish descent
Jewish Canadian sportspeople
Jewish ice hockey players
Montreal Canadiens coaches
Montreal Canadiens executives
People from Montérégie
Stanley Cup champions
Stanley Cup championship-winning head coaches
Cecil Hart